The United States ambassador to Saint Lucia is the official representative of the government of the United States to the government of Saint Lucia. The ambassador is the United States Ambassador to Barbados and the Eastern Caribbean, resident in Bridgetown, Barbados, and is concurrently the ambassador to Antigua and Barbuda, Barbados, Dominica, Grenada, St. Kitts and Nevis, and St. Vincent and the Grenadines.

No U.S. mission has ever been established at Castries. All diplomatic functions are handled out of the U.S. Embassy at Bridgetown, Barbados, where the U.S. Ambassador to Saint Lucia is resident.

List of U.S. ambassadors to Saint Lucia
The following is a list of U.S. ambassadors, or other chiefs of mission, to Saint Lucia. The title given by the United States State Department to this position is currently Ambassador Extraordinary and Plenipotentiary.

See also
Saint Lucia – United States relations
Foreign relations of Saint Lucia
Ambassadors of the United States

References

United States Department of State: Background notes on Saint Lucia

External links
 United States Department of State: Chiefs of Mission for Saint Lucia
 United States Department of State: Saint Lucia
 United States Embassy in Bridgetown

 01
United States
Saint Lucia
Saint Lucia